The West Branch Nezinscot River is an  river in Maine. It flows from Shagg Pond in Woodstock to its confluence with the East Branch in Buckfield.  The resulting river, the Nezinscot, flows east to the Androscoggin River, which in turn flows southeast to the Kennebec River near its mouth at the Atlantic Ocean.

See also
List of rivers of Maine

References

Maine Streamflow Data from the USGS
Maine Watershed Data From Environmental Protection Agency

Tributaries of the Kennebec River
Rivers of Maine
Rivers of Oxford County, Maine